David Pollock (born 19 March 1987 in Omagh, County Tyrone, Northern Ireland) is a retired rugby union player. He played for Ulster Rugby in the Celtic League and represented Dungannon RFC who play in the AIB League.

Pollock's position of choice was as an Open Side Flanker.

Pollock captained Ireland Under-20s to a Six Nations grandslam in 2007. He represented Ireland A against England Saxons on 1 February 2008  and has also represented them in the Churchill Cup.

Pollock was forced to retire from rugby at 23 due to a hip injury. He has since pursued a career in medicine.

References

External links
Ulster profile
David Pollock signs a 2 year full contract for Ulster Rugby

1987 births
Living people
Rugby union flankers
Irish rugby union players
Ulster Rugby players
Queen's University RFC players
Dungannon RFC players
Rugby union players from County Tyrone